Tekstylnyk stadium or Cheksil stadium is a football stadium in Chernihiv, Ukraine. The stadium was built nearby the Khimik Sports Complex. It was formerly the home arena of the female football club WFC Lehenda-ShVSM Chernihiv. Designed for 2,000 spectators, the field is 102 × 65 m. The field is in Ushinsky, novozavodsky, district, just beside Cheksil factory 2–3 km from the Chernihiv Ovruch railway and the Monument to Soldiers Liberators in Victory Square.

Basic information
The stadium is near the territory of the worsted-cloth combine "Cheksil". From 1987 until 2018, it became the home arena of the female football club "WFC Lehenda-ShVSM Chernihiv", having played at the other champions of the USSR and Ukraine. Despite the fact that Tekstilnik did not meet the UEFA standards, matches of the group stage of the female League of Champions were held at the earliest of the 2010s.

Due to lack of funding, the stadium was in a state of disrepair and it was rebuilt at the zanedbanny camp. Since 2018, no individual plastic seats have been installed on it, and most of the wooden bench seats have been broken. The concrete structures of the stadium are also partially damaged.

Also the defunct men's soccer team "FC Cheksyl Chernihiv" who won the Chernihiv Oblast Football Championship in 1997, used the Stadium Tekstylschyk for the season.

Stadium during the war
The stadium suffered  during the battles for Chernihiv in February-April 2022. In particular, the running tracks of the stadium and the stands were damaged.

See also
 List of sports venues in Chernihiv

External links
 wikimapia.org
 wikimapia.org

References

Football venues in Chernihiv
Football venues in Chernihiv Oblast
Multi-purpose stadiums in Ukraine
Sports venues in Chernihiv
Sports complexes
Buildings and structures in Chernihiv
Football venues in Ukraine
Sports complexes in Ukraine